Kate Larimore Turabian (born Laura Kate Larimore, February 26, 1893 – October 25, 1987) was an Armenian-American educator who is best known for her book A Manual for Writers of Research Papers, Theses, and Dissertations. In 2018 the University of Chicago Press published the 9th edition of the book. The University of Chicago Press estimates that the various editions of this book have sold more than 9 million copies since its publication in 1937.  A 2016 analysis of over one million college course syllabi found that Turabian was the most commonly assigned female author due to this book.

Turabian was the graduate school dissertation secretary at the University of Chicago from 1930 to 1958. The school required her approval for every master's thesis and doctoral dissertation.  The various editions of her style guide present and closely follow the University of Chicago Press's Manual of Style ("Chicago style").

Her A Manual for Writers of Research Papers, Theses, and Dissertations and its associated style are referred to as "Turabian".

See also
Diana Hacker

Notes

Further reading
Turabian, Kate L. A Manual for Writers of Research Papers, Theses, and Dissertations. 8th ed. Revised by Wayne C. Booth, Gregory G. Colomb, Joseph M. Williams, and the University of Chicago Press Staff. Chicago: University of Chicago Press, 2013.   (10).   (13).   (10).   (13).
Turabian, Kate L. Student's Guide to Writing College Papers. 4th ed. Revised by Gregory G. Colomb, Joseph M. Williams, and the University of Chicago Press Editorial Staff. Chicago: University of Chicago Press, 2010. .

External links
A Manual for Writers of Research Papers, Theses, and Dissertations: Chicago Style for Students and Researchers – Dedicated webpage at the University of Chicago Press; includes "Who was Kate Turabian?"
 "eTurabian Citation Generator" at eturabian.com

1893 births
1987 deaths
Writers from Chicago
Writers of style guides
University of Chicago faculty
20th-century American non-fiction writers
20th-century American Episcopalians